Tanveer Jamal (30 June 1960 – 13 July 2022) was a Pakistani actor, director and producer.

Personal life
After doing his matriculation in Karachi, he went to France for higher studies, and later worked in Japan as a fashion model, while he was also a squash player and a cinematographer.

He was a painter as well, gifting paintings to fellow actor Aijaz Aslam.

He was married to a Japanese woman with whom he had three children, the family living in Japan.

Career

He has been prominent in Pakistan for the last 35 years through his brilliant acting. 

Jamal has also been awarded the Best Actor Award by PTV for his outstanding performance. Jamal started his career before 1990 with director Kazim Pasha's play Janglos and got fame from the first play.

Jamal also acted in several other popular dramas of the 90s including PTV's other popular dramas Jinnah to Quaid, Samjhauta, Babar, Antha, Janam Jalli and Jalte Suraj and made his unique mark in a short time. He made his name by directing and producing the first action-packed mega drama serial Godfather in a private production while this drama serial was recorded in Pakistan and Japan.

Death 
Jamal was diagnosed with cancer for the first time in 2016 but recovered after treatment. Later he was diagnosed with cancer again, which affected his health. In May 2022 he decided to move to Japan for complete treatment of cancer. He died on 13 July 2022, in Tokyo.

References

1960 births
2022 deaths
Pakistani male stage actors
Pakistani directors
Pakistani producers
Pakistani expatriates in Japan
20th-century Pakistani male actors
PTV Award winners
21st-century Pakistani male actors
Pakistani male television actors
Male actors from Karachi